The Billy Joel Band is the band that backs singer-songwriter and pianist Billy Joel on both studio and live recordings. The band began with the recording of his first album as a solo artist in 1971; it stabilized around 1975 and underwent several lineup changes in the late 1980s and early 1990s. Joel's touring band as a whole did not begin playing on his records until he recorded the album Turnstiles in 1976. This line-up included Richie Cannata on saxophones and organ, Liberty DeVitto on drums, Russell Javors and Howie Emerson on guitars, and Doug Stegmeyer on bass.

The band, which now no longer includes any of its original members, is often not recognized as a formal entity, and is instead referred to simply as Billy Joel's band.  The Lords of 52nd Street is a band formed by the original band members that previously played with Joel.

Career

Early days 
Joel's original touring band, formed in 1971 to support the Cold Spring Harbor album, comprised Rhys Clark on drums, Al Hertzberg on guitar, and Larry Russell on bass. The group toured throughout the United States, including Puerto Rico.

The touring lineup changed and it took a few years for the lineup to stabilize. In an online interview, DeVitto describes how Joel's classic late 1970s-early 1980s band first came together: Billy and I used to play the same club in Plainview, Long Island, called My House. He was 17 and in a band called The Hassles and I was 16 and in a band called The New Rock Workshop. We would watch each other play and acknowledge each other in passing. In 1974, he was living in Los Angeles and had already released Piano Man and Streetlife Serenade. He used studio musicians for the recording and different guys out on the road. I was playing in a band called Topper with Doug Stegmeyer and he got the gig to play bass with Billy on the “Streetlife” tour. [Billy] told Doug that he wanted to move back to New York and find a permanent band he could record and tour with on a regular basis. Doug recommended me because Billy was looking for a New York-type drummer, aggressive and hard hitting, and the rest is history. The three of us recorded the basic tracks for Turnstiles and we both recommended Russell Javors and Howie Emerson, who played guitars in Topper and with the addition of Richie Cannata on saxophone, the “Billy Joel Band” was born.

By the late 1970s, the touring and studio lineup of Joel's band stabilized and consisted, mostly, of the following musicians:

 Liberty DeVitto – drums, percussion
 Doug Stegmeyer – bass guitar, backing vocals
 Russell Javors – rhythm and lead guitars, harmonica, occasional percussion, backing vocals
 Richie Cannata – saxophones, flute, clarinet, percussion, keyboards
 David Brown – lead guitar, occasional percussion, backing vocals

This was the basic lineup for some of Joel's classic albums of the 1970s and 1980s including Turnstiles, The Stranger, 52nd Street, Glass Houses, and Songs in the Attic.

In 2014, Cannata, DeVitto, and Javors reunited and performed a short set of Joel's songs at the ceremony during which they were inducted into the Long Island Music Hall of Fame, (with Stegmeyer, posthumously), primarily for their work with Joel. They officially formed a band, The Lords of 52nd Street, which plays faithful renditions of the original Joel recordings. David Clark of the Joel tribute band Songs in the Attic plays piano and provides lead vocals, Malcolm Gold plays bass, Ken Cino plays guitar, and Doug Kistner plays keyboards in the group.

Line-up changes 

From The Stranger in 1977 through The Bridge in 1986, Joel had been working with the same producer, Phil Ramone, as well as with the same basic incarnation of the Billy Joel Band (with minor line-up changes over the years). Joel also added lead guitarist David Brown in 1978 who stayed with the band throughout the 1980s, beginning with the recording of Glass Houses (1980). One important addition to the band in 1982 was the replacement of his long-time saxophonist Richie Cannata with Mark Rivera. But for the 1989 album Storm Front, Joel chose a new producer, Mick Jones (of the band Foreigner), and started to make more significant changes to the band. At this point, the only players that Joel kept, for both his touring band and for the recording of the album, were Brown, Rivera, and DeVitto. He also added the percussionist and multi-instrumentalist Crystal Taliefero who would become a permanent fixture in his band while Stegmeyer was replaced by Schuyler Deale and Javors was replaced by Joey Hunting on the album and Tommy Byrnes for its accompanying tour.

For his last studio album, River of Dreams, in 1993, Joel used a new producer again (this time Danny Kortchmar). Although Joel continued to use DeVitto as his main drummer, he allowed Kortchmar to use different drummers for some of the drum tracks. Cannata returned to record some of the sax parts on the record but did not join Joel for the River of Dreams tour that followed.

At this point, the only remaining long-standing member of Joel's touring band was DeVitto. Joel also had Tommy Byrnes move over to lead guitar. He remains at this position and served as both a musical consultant and band member in the Movin' Out musical. Tom "T-Bone" Wolk joined the band, just for the River of Dreams tour, playing bass guitar, as well as other instruments, including accordion. And Joel continued to retain Taliefero and Rivera who both remain in his band. The 1993 River of Dreams tour saw the addition of David Rosenthal, formerly of Rainbow, on keyboards.

In August 1995, Joel's long-time bassist Doug Stegmeyer, who had been let go from the band prior to the recording of 1989's Storm Front album, committed suicide in his Long Island home. Stegmeyer had played on every one of Joel's albums from Turnstiles (1976) through to the live album, КОНЦЕРТ (1987).

For the 2006 tour, Joel did not invite DeVitto back as drummer after the two became involved in a legal dispute, and the drummer Chuck Burgi (who played in the Broadway production of Movin' Out) replaced DeVitto. For this particular tour, Cannata temporarily returned on lead saxophones though he soon left the band again and Rivera returned to his position as lead saxophonist. In 2006, Carl Fischer joined Joel's band as his trumpeter and trombonist for select songs (most notably for the trumpet solos in the song "Zanzibar").

On February 27, 2010, Joel's bassist from his "River of Dreams" tour, Tom Wolk, died from a heart attack at the age of 58.

In 2013, the Billy Joel Band was joined by multi-instrumentalist Mike DelGuidice on rhythm guitar and backing vocals, DelGuidice had previously fronted various Billy Joel tribute projects.

Members

Current members
Billy Joel's current lineup (with the exception of DelGuidice) was featured on his 2006 album, 12 Gardens Live and on the film and recording, Live at Shea Stadium (2011). It includes the following musicians:

 Billy Joel  – lead vocals, piano, harmonica, occasional rhythm guitar 
 Mark Rivera  – saxophone, flute, clarinet, vocals, percussion, harmonica, rhythm guitar 
 Tommy Byrnes  – lead guitar ; backing vocals ; rhythm guitar 
 Crystal Taliefero – percussion, vocals, saxophone, harmonica 
 Dave Rosenthal – keyboards, backing vocals, musical director 
 Andy Cichon – bass guitar, backing vocals 
 Chuck Burgi – drums, percussion 
 Carl Fischer – trumpet, flugelhorn, trombone, saxophone, clarinet 
 Mike DelGuidice – rhythm guitar, vocals, piano

Past members
 Larry Russell  – bass guitar 
 Al Hertzberg  – lead guitar 
 Rhys Clark  – drums 
 Don Evans  – rhythm guitar 
 Patrick McDonald  – bass guitar 
 Tom Whitehorse  – banjo, pedal steel guitar 
 Johnny Almond  – saxophone, keyboards 
 Doug Stegmeyer  – bass guitar, backing vocals 
 Howard Emerson  – lead guitar 
 Russell Javors  – rhythm and lead guitars, harmonica, occasional percussion, backing vocals 
 Liberty DeVitto  – drums, percussion 
 Richie Cannata  – saxophones, flute, clarinet, percussion, keyboards, backing vocals 
 David Brown  – lead guitar, occasional percussion, backing vocals 
 David Lebolt  – keyboards 
 Kevin Dukes  – lead guitar 
 Schuyler Deale  – bass guitar 
 Jeff Jacobs  – keyboards 
 Mindy Jostyn  – backing vocals, guitar, violin, keyboards 
 Tom Wolk  – bass guitar, accordion, mandolin, backing vocals 
 David Santos  – bass guitar

Timeline

References

1971 establishments in New York (state)
Rock music groups from New York (state)
Billy Joel
Musical backing groups
Musical groups established in 1971